S. Swarnajothi was the 38th Auditor General of Sri Lanka. He was appointed on 3 January 2007, succeeding P. A. Pematilaka. He was succeeded by H. A. S. Samaraweera. Swarnajothi serves on the Board of Directors of Commercial Bank since 20 August 2012. He is a Fellow of the Institute of Chartered Accountants of Sri Lanka and a Fellow of the Institute of Certified Management Accountants of Sri Lanka and also a member of the Institute of Certified Management Accountants of Australia.

References

Auditors General of Sri Lanka
Alumni of the University of Sri Jayewardenepura
Alumni of the University of Moratuwa